Abdul Meniem Al-Toras is the former Commander of the Egyptian Air Defense Command. He graduated from the Air Defense college in 1972, and saw action in the Yom Kippur War. He is the first commander-in-chief of the Egyptian Air Defense Forces who graduated from the Air Defense College and was commissioned in the Air Defense Forces as a separated military branch. All previous commanders-in-chief were graduates of the Army academy and were commissioned in Army units, in fact many of them were commissioned in non-AD units like Armour, Artillery, Infantry, and Signals. He held most of the notable commands in the Egyptian Air Defense. On 14 August 2012 President Mohamed Morsi Appointed him as the new Commander in Chief of the Egyptian Air Defence command after he dismissed Lt. General Abd El Aziz Seif-Eldeen. He is a member of the Supreme Council of the Armed Forces, which was reorganized in September 2012.

Military education
 The Main Course
 Brigades fire leader Course
 Battalions fire leader Course
 Main Staff Course 
 War Course, Fellowship of the Higher War College, Nasser's Military Sciences Academy

Medals and decorations
 Sinai Liberation Medal
 Longevity and Exemplary Medal
 Distinguished Service Decoration
 Training medal
 
 October Fighters Medal
 The 20th anniversary of the revolution Medal
 The 50th anniversary of the revolution Medal
 Air Defense's Day Medal
 Silver Jubilee of October war's victory Medal

References

Living people
Year of birth missing (living people)
Egyptian generals
Members of the Supreme Council of the Armed Forces
Egyptian people of the Yom Kippur War
20th-century Egyptian military personnel